The Yeongsangang River is a river in south-western South Korea. It has a length of 129.50 km, and covers an area of 3,467.83 km2. It  runs through Damyang, Naju, Gwangju and other regions and eventually flows into the Yellow Sea at Yeongam through the estuary bank.

See also
Rivers of Korea
Geography of South Korea

Notes

References

External links

A paper describing the effects of the damming efforts of the late 1970s and 1980s

Rivers of South Jeolla Province
Rivers of Gwangju
Naju
Yeongam County
Mokpo
Damyang County